Revolver Revue is a Czech quarterly literary magazine published in Prague, Czech Republic. The magazine was an underground periodical and issued legally after the Velvet Revolution.

History and profile
Revolver Revue was established in January 1985. The first issue was only fifty copies. The founders were Ivan Lamper, Jáchym Topol and Viktor Karlík.

The magazine became a literary magazine in December 1990. It is published four times a year.

A complete archive of "Revolver Revue" exists at Libri Prohibiti, a library of prohibited and banned books and samizdat in Prague.

References

1985 establishments in Czechoslovakia
Literary magazines published in the Czech Republic
Czech-language magazines
Magazines established in 1985
Magazines published in Prague
Quarterly magazines